Wysoczany  is a village in the administrative district of Gmina Komańcza, within Sanok County, in the Subcarpathian Voivodeship (province) of south-eastern Poland, close to the border with Slovakia.

The village has a population of 110.

History
Country invested by Nicholas Herburt Odnowskiego around 1539, since 1635 to nearly Wallachia. Until 1772, the Ruthenian region, the land of Sanok. From 1772 belonged to cyrkułu Zaleski, and Sanok in Galicia. 

To 1914 in Sanok County Office, the judicial district in Bukowsko. In 1936 the village had 634 inhabitants and in 2010 the village had 110 inhabitants. Part of the village was Wólka Kożuszne (167 inhabitants). The village has a stud farm and several farm tourism. From November 1918 to January 1919, it was part of the Komancza Republic. 

After 1944, the local Rusyny Ruthenians Ukrainians deported to the Ukrainian SSR and they found the resettled population exchange. 

In the years 1975-1998 belonged to the village administrative regional capital Rzeszów.

Orthodox Church
The records of the wooden village church of "St. Paraskeva", was built in 1805. Its width was 6 meters, and 17 meters in length, and 12 meters in height. It had three large domes with brass crosses. The bell tower was wooden with one dome, and four bells. The church was occupied by the Eastern Orthodox until 1944. The church was destroyed by the Polish Army during World War II.

The cemetery dates back to 1512. After the church of 1805 was destroyed, there was little effort done to maintain the cemetery area. Since 1805 until the 1990s, the cemetery had been overgrown with trees and shrubs. Today, there are only a few tomb stones from that era left. Some have been destroyed during the building of the new stone church and by the people living there today. 

The new Orthodox church was built in 1998, in the same place that the original former Orthodox church of 1805, of St. Paraskeva stood. Which was a subsidiary of the parish in futile. The new church now falls within the parish church in Mokre to the Uniates. The stone Orthodox Church was originally intended as a cemetery chapel. Externally it is covered with a tin roof and slain plates, The dome finished with an apparent signature of the Orthodox cross to the sanctuary for Christian. In the interior of a modern iconostasis painted by Mrs. Krogulecką. In 2005, the church has been partially constructed wall paintings.

Before the curtain is the church bell tower with modern bells. The old four bell from the former church (1805), were stolen.

Today, the only evidence that can be seen of the Church of the 1805 is the few tomb stones and the stone wall, surrounding the cemetery.

After the church conducts Mr. Jan Holowaty, Wysoczany 3.

Residents 
Surname of residents: 
Bajtsowa, Basik, Bodnik, Chlibik, Chomik, Dodzow, Duński, Gelb, Hrycko, Hepko, Holowaty, Huzyla, Hajdush, Hotsko, Hvozda, Horonova, Hlibyk, Hajdush, Jacis, Jacyla, Kostyk, Kachala, Kaczała, Karpa, Korchma, Kachmar, Kiryk, Królak, Krycko, Lachar, Lewczak, Lukacheva, Luchkanych, Lukacz, Marcyszyn, Mashljanek, Maślany, Melnyk, Mytso, Orziński, Owad, Ochych, Priadka, Petrunjova, Pichova, Sachar, Sas, Shlomko, Sawa, Sykiełyk, Suchyna, Szevtsova, Szczerba, Tsap, Tsynanko, Tsinova, Ujcio, Wajda, Nawalaniec, Worotyła, Warholjak, Zawada.

House Numbers (German Records)
1.	Kachmar
2.	Holowaty
3.	Mashljanyk
4.	Ochych 
5.	Bodnik 
6.	Priadka 
7.	Pichova 
8.	Sachar
9.	Karpa 
10.	Suchyna
11.	Suchyna
12.	Korchma 
13.	Hrycko 
14.	Hajdush 
15.	Hotsko
16.	Hajdush 
17.	Sekielyk
18.	Krolak 
19.	Bajtsowa
20.	Hajdush 
21.	Szeremeta 
22.	Lukacheva 
23.	Kostyk
24.	Kachala 
25.	Huzyla 
26.	Sahar 
27.	Hvozda 
28.	Lewczak 
29.	Chlibik
30.	Jacis
31.	Kiryk
32.	Zawada
33.	Hepko
34.	Gelb 
35.	Lukacz
36.	
37.	Nawalaniec
38.	Sawa
39.	Melnyk
40.	Melnyk
41.	Krycko
42.	Chomik
43.	Basik
44.	Lachar
45.	Ujcio
46.	Owad
47.	Owad
48.	Owad
49.	Marcyszyn
50.	Szczerba
51.	Tsinova 
52.	Dodzova
53.	Saharowa 
54.	Mashljanyk 
55.	Luchkanych 
56.	Mashljanyk
57.	Mytso 
58.	Jacyla
59.	Jacyla 
60.	Village Ukrainian School 
61.	Bodnik 
62.	Tsynanko 
63.	Shlomko 
64.	Warholjak
65.	Kroljak 
66.	Village Orthodox Church
67.	Horonova 
68.	Hlibyk 
69.	Sekielyk 
70.	Mashljanyk
71.	Maslany
72.	Orzinski
73.	Worotyla
74.	Luchkanych
75.	Petrunjova
76.	Slabka
77.	Petrunjova
78.	Bajtsowa
79.	Sas 
80.	Sas 
81.	Hrytsko 
82.	Jacyla 
83.	Szevtsova
84.	Szevtsova
85.	Wajda 
86.	Tsap 
87.	Tsap
88.	Kaczala

As of 2009: 
Karpa, Hołowaty, Kaczała, Słabka, Terebecka, Starego, Kuper, Szeremeta, Bodnik, Janicki, Zawiślan, Wrona, Ślazyk, Kielan, Dyka, Błaż, Parzyszek, Bukowski.

References

Villages in Sanok County